The flag of the Azerbaijan Soviet Socialist Republic was a plain red flag with a golden hammer and sickle and a gold-bordered red star in its upper canton and an horizontal dark blue band on the bottom fourth, representing the Caspian Sea.

The last version of the flag of the Azerbaijan SSR was firstly introduced by K.M.A. Kyazimzade, director of the Azerbaijan State Museum of Art, and was officially adopted as national flag by the decree of the Presidium of the Supreme Soviet of Azerbaijan SSR on October 7, 1952. Definition was as follows:

The text of national flag in the Constitution of the Azerbaijan SSR was updated on August 18, 1953. However, the text didn't specify the proportion of the hammer and sickle. On May 5, 1956, the Presidium of the Supreme Soviet of Azerbaijan SSR approved the "Regulations on the State flag of the Azerbaijan Soviet Socialist Republic", which further regulated the details of the elements on the flag. On March 16, 1981, the Presidium of the Supreme Soviet of Azerbaijan SSR further issued a decree specify that no hammer and sickle should be printed on the reverse side of the flag.

Color scheme

History 
From the second part of 1921 to 1922, Azerbaijan SSR used a red flag with the yellow Cyrillic characters АССР (ASSR). On March 12, 1922, the Azerbaijan SSR united with the Georgian SSR and the Armenian SSR under the Transcaucasian SFSR (TSFSR), that was split again into these three republics in 1936.

In 1937, a golden hammer and sickle was added in the top left-hand corner, with beneath the Latin characters AzSSR in a serif font in place of the Cyrillic characters. A third version was issued in 1940s, and had AzSSR substituted by its Cyrillic version АзССР.

The last version of the flag was adopted by the Azerbaijan SSR on October 7, 1952. It was the flag of the Soviet Union, with a horizontal blue band on the bottom fourth. The 1952 flag was discarded on February 5, 1991, when the flag of Azerbaijan SSR based on the Azerbaijan Democratic Republic was re-introduced.

See also
Flag of the Soviet Union
Flag of Azerbaijan
Coat of Arms of Azerbaijan

References

Azerbaijan Soviet Socialist Republic
Azerbaijan Soviet Socialist Republic
National symbols of Azerbaijan
Flags of Azerbaijan